The Friedrichshafen D.I (company designation Friedrichshafen FF.46) was a German single-seat fighter plane developed by the Flugzeugbau Friedrichshafen during the First World War. Two prototypes were flown in 1917, but it was judged inferior to the Albatros D.III then in production and no further production ensued.

Background and description
The Flugzeugbau Friedrichshafen aircraft manufacturing company, after having failed to sell the FF.43 fighter floatplane to the Imperial German Navy's Naval Air Service in 1916, modified its design for land service in an attempt to sell it to the German Army's Inspectorate of Flying Troops (Idflieg). The Army accepted Friedrichshafen's proposal in September and ordered three prototypes, only two of which are known to have been completed.

Although the D.I was developed from the FF.43, they did not share any components. The D.I replaced the floats with a conventional landing gear arrangement, but retained its predecessor's single-bay, staggered-wing design,  Mercedes D.III straight-six engine and its pair of synchronised  LMG 08/15 Spandau machine guns. The two prototypes known to have been built differed only in the cabanes securing the upper wing to the fuselage; the first aircraft had vertical cabanes while the second had ones that were angled outwards for better pilot visibility.

The two prototypes were tested by Idflieg until 28 April 1917, revealing that they possessed flight characteristics and performance inferior to that of the Albatross D.III, so it did not order the D.I into production and the project was abandoned. Idflieg did not retain performance data for aircraft that it did not accept.

Specifications

See also

References

Bibliography
 

1910s German fighter aircraft
Biplanes
Single-engined tractor aircraft
D.I
Aircraft first flown in 1917